Soymida is a genus of flowering plants belonging to the family Meliaceae. It is found on the Indian subcontinent and Myanmar. It contains a single species, Soymida febrifuga.

References

Meliaceae
Monotypic Sapindales genera